Lir-e Kuchek (also Romanized as Līr-e Kūchek and Lir Koochak; also known as Līr) is a village in Tayebi-ye Garmsiri-ye Jonubi Rural District, in the Central District of Kohgiluyeh County, Kohgiluyeh and Boyer-Ahmad Province, Iran. At the 2006 census, its population was 118, in 24 families.

References 

Populated places in Kohgiluyeh County